Girl in the War EP is an EP by American singer-songwriter Josh Ritter. It was originally released on August 29, 2006, as a download-only EP. Then on November 27, 2006, it was released as a CD. It features one album track, the title track, along with several covers and demos.

Critical reception

Jamie Curtis of Contact Music compared Ritter in Girl in the War to other great Americana songwriters such as Woody Guthrie, Bob Dylan, Johnny Cash, Neil Young.

Track listing
All songs written by Josh Ritter, except "Blame it on the Tetons" written by Dan Gallucci, Eric Judy, Isaac Brock, and Tom Peloso of Modest Mouse.

"Girl in the War" (album version) – 4:24
"Blame it on the Tetons" (Modest Mouse cover) – 4:04
"Harbortown" (non-album track) – 3:11
"Peter Killed the Dragon" (non-album track) – 2:32
"Monster Ballads" (early version) – 4:37
"In the Dark" (acoustic demo) – 4:29
"Girl in the War" (acoustic demo) – 4:16

References

External links
Josh Ritter official website

2006 EPs
Josh Ritter albums
V2 Records EPs